USCGC Kiska (WPB-1336) is an Island class cutter of the United States Coast Guard, named for the island of Kiska, Alaska.

Design
The Island-class patrol boats were constructed in Bollinger Shipyards, Lockport, Louisiana. It is powered two Paxman Valenta 16 CM diesel engines or two Caterpillar 3516 diesel engines. It has two  3304T diesel generators made by Caterpillar; these can serve as motor–generators. Its hull is constructed from highly strong steel, and the superstructure and major deck are constructed from aluminium.

It is fitted with one  autocannon and two  M60 light machine guns; it may also be fitted with two Browning .50 Caliber Machine Guns. It is fitted with satellite navigation systems, collision avoidance systems, surface radar, and a Loran C system. Its complement is sixteen (two officers and fourteen crew members). Island-class patrol boats are based on Vosper Thornycroft  patrol boats and have similar dimensions.

History
On March 19, 2002 the Kiska intercepted the Taiwanese fishing vessel Full Means II (富明二號), which had been taken over by its cook, who had murdered the captain and first mate.

References

External links

Ships of the United States Coast Guard
Island-class patrol boats
1990 ships
Ships built in Lockport, Louisiana